Saint Wenceslas Chorale or simply Saint Wenceslas is the church hymn and one of the oldest known Czech songs and Czech religious anthems. Its roots can be found in the 12th century and it belongs to the most popular religious songs also today, and to the oldest still used European chants. The hymn is mentioned as "old and well-known" in the chronicle from the 13th century. Also strophic structure, language and undulating melody and harmonization confirm that assumption. The text of the song  had originally three strophes. To the chant, originally in Old Czech, some new strophes have been added and also removed from over the centuries. Its final form becomes from the turn 18th and 19th century and in that version is still used today.

The content of the anthem is a prayer to Saint Wenceslas, Duke of Bohemia and the Czech patron saint to intercede for his nation in God to help from injustice and ensure the salvation. The hymn is regularly sung today, usually at the end of a Sunday Mass or a major Christian holidays.

In 1918, in the beginnings of the Czechoslovak state, the song was discussed as a possible candidate for the national anthem.

Modifications of the song 

Saint Wenceslas Chorale inspired some of Czech composers to the creation of variations on the theme. As well known examples can be mentioned:
 Josef Suk: Meditation on St.Wenceslas chorale, op. 35a
 Vítězslav Novák: Svatováclavský triptych • toccata, ciacona and fugue,  op. 70
 Pavel Haas: Suite for Oboe and Piano, Op. 17

References 

Czech songs
Czech anthems
Czech Christian hymns
Czech music
Czech folklore
Czech early music
12th-century hymns
Songwriter unknown
Wenceslaus I, Duke of Bohemia